Aleksandrs Čaks (born Aleksandrs Čadarainis; 27 October 1901 – 8 February 1950), was a Latvian poet and writer. Čaks is arguably the first Latvian writer whose works are distinctly urban, compared to the usual depictions of country life or small villages in earlier Latvian literature.

Biography 
He was born in Riga to a tailor's family, and, continuing to live in Riga, he followed the city's life in his poetry. In 1911 he started studies in Alexanders Gymnasium in Riga. After First World War started gymnasium was evacuated first to Voru, Estonia and later to Saransk, Russia. In gymnasium he got good education and was often seen reading philosophical works. He most preferred works of Kant, Nietzsche and Hegel.
In 1918 Čaks started Medicine studies in Moscow University. He actively participated in cultural life of Russian students especially in literary evenings where he often discussed with futurists and imaginists.
In February 1920 Čaks was drafted in Soviet Red army and became organizer of cultural and political life in a military hospital.

In 1922 Čaks together with many former Red latvian riflemen returned to Latvia. In Riga he resumed his medicine studies in University of Latvia. However he soon lost interest about that subject and left his studies. In 1925 Čaks got a teachers certificate and started to work in Drabeši primary school as a teacher and administrator. He left this job in 1927 to devote himself to literature.
In 1928 Čaks established literary magazine Jauno Lira for young Latvian writers and poets. He also participated in leftist magazine Trauksme.
From 1930 until 1934 Čaks was a secretary in the Latvian writer and journalist trade union. Also he was one of the editors of magazine Domas.

After the K. Ulmanis coup in 1934 all trade unions and leftist magazines and political parties were banned. From 1934 until 1939, Aleksandrs Čaks worked as a clerk in the Riga city savings bank. Also he started to give lectures about literature in private school. In addition to that he worked as technical editor in Association of Latvian Riflemen, where he helped to publish a collection of documents and memories entitled Latviešu strēlnieki. Inspired by memories of the riflemen he wrote collection of epic poems Mūžības Skartie for which he got the A. Brigadere prize in 1939. From 1939 until 1940 he worked in one of the biggest Latvian magazines entitled Atpūta.

After the Soviet occupation of Latvia in 1940, Čaks was criticized for anti-soviet undertones in several poems from Mūžības Skartie. Nonetheless he was accepted into the writers union of the Latvian SSR in Spring 1941. After the Latvian occupation by Nazi Germany Čaks was not allowed to publish and lived very privately. In 1943 he wrote a play Matīss, kausu bajārs.

After the Soviet Army entered Riga for the second time in October 1944, Čaks started to work in one of the biggest Soviet newspapers Cīņa where he led a cultural section.  However, already in 1946 campaign of criticism was turned against Čaks's literary career and in 1947 he was fired from the Cīņa newspaper. He started to work in the Institute of Language and Literature of the Latvian Academy of Science.

However, criticism of him continued. In 1949, with Latvia being a part of the Soviet Union, Čaks was accused of straying from Marxist values and writing politically incorrect works. The accusations weakened Čaks's health, and he died of heart disease on February 8, 1950. Currently, one of the central streets of Riga is named after him. There's also a memorial museum in that street and a statue in nearby Ziedoņdārzs Park.

Works 
Čaks published his first poetry book, Seši, in 1928, dedicated to Riga and its life. These poems included topics and characters previously not depicted in Latvian poetry – city night life, homeless people, prostitutes, poor suburbs, even the sewers in blockhouses. In his works, Čaks shows his deep love for Riga as it is, which is well seen in the title of a poem, "Heart on the pavement". Riga is not the only subject of his poems, though – Čaks also wrote romantic poetry and works dedicated to the Latvian riflemen. Čaks also wrote some short stories, although they are generally not as well known as his poems.

See also 
 Drabeši Manor
 Inara Cedrins, "Between Two Rains." Selected poems translated into English, e-book, 2013. ISBN B00C10SNZG. https://www.amazon.com/Between-Two-Rains-Aleksandrs-Caks-ebook/dp/B00C10SNZG

Bibliography 
From the collection of the Library of Congress, Washington, DC:

Augstā krasta (1950)
Č-a-k-s (2005) 4 volumes; Facsim. reprints. Originally published: Seši, 1928, and Zaļā vārna, 1929.
Cīņai un darbam; dzejas (1951)
Debesu dāvana: vienas vasaras dzejoļi (1980)
Dvēsele kabatā: dzeja (2000) 
Dzejas izlase (1996) 
Igra zhiznʹi︠u︡ (1970)
Izlase (1971) 2 volumes.
Kārlis Skalbe: raksti un atmiņas (1999) 
Kļava lapa (1969)
Kopoti raksti: 6 sējumos (1991–2001) 5 volumes. 
Kremlī pie Ļeņina (1980)
Mana mīlestība (1958)
Mana paradīze (1951)
Mana Rīga: dzejoļi un poēmas (1961)
Mūžības skartie (1950)
Mūžības skartie: dzejas par latviešu strēlniekiem (1981, 1988) 
Patrioti, dzejojumi un dzejoļi (1948)
Raksti (1971)
Rīga: 30. gadi (1983)
Savādais gaidītājs: dzeja un proza (2004) 
Selected poems Preface and selection by Arvīds Grigulis; translated by Ruth Speirs. (1979)
Spēle ar dzīvību: noveles, stāsti, tēlojumi (2000) 
Tikai tevi es mīlējis esmu: dzejoļi (1986)
Umurkumurs (1968)
Vēlais viesis (2005) 
Zelta ielāps: dzejas izlase 1972 (1972)
Zem cēlās zvaigznes; dzejoļi un dzejojumi (1948)

Sources 

1901 births
1950 deaths
Writers from Riga
People from Kreis Riga
Latvian poets
20th-century poets
Soviet military personnel of the Russian Civil War